The following charts list the seasons and cast members of the long-running reality television show, The Real World, its reunion shows, and its DVDs.

The Real World seasons

The Real World reunions

In April 2008 at the MTV's Real World Awards Bash, viewers voted on their favorite The Real World season on MTV.com. Voting is presumably skewed by more recent seasons being more relevant to the voters at the time.

The Real World DVDs

References